Free-to-view (FTV) is a term used for audiovisual transmissions that are provided free without any form of continual subscription . It differs from free-to-air (FTA) in that the program is encrypted.

Free-to-view vs. free-to-air
The free-to-view system contrasts with free-to-air (FTA), in which signals are transmitted in the clear, without encryption, and can be received by anyone with a suitable receiving dish antenna and DVB-compliant receiver (although these services can include proprietary encrypted data services such as an EPG that is only available to reception equipment made for, or authorised by, the FTA broadcaster). Free-to-view services are broadcast encrypted and can only be viewed with reception equipment that includes a suitable conditional-access module and viewing card, in the same way as a pay-TV satellite service. However, the FTV service viewing card is not subject to a continuing subscription payment for viewing the service's channels and may be available for a regular fee, a one-off payment or even for free.

Services which charge a regular fee for reception can still be considered free-to-view, and not pay-TV if the fee is not for the programming content but for the delivery.   For example, the HD+ service in Germany, which broadcasts HD versions of channels which are also available free-to-air in standard definition, defended its service fee saying it "is related to the reception of the offer and not to specific content, parts or packages of the offer".

Commercial restrictions and targeting
The free-to-view system allows for restricting access based on location of the viewer. For example, in the UK prior to the launch of Astra 2D, UK channels broadcasting from the Astra 28.2°E satellites used a wide beam and could be received across Europe on small dishes. Those channels which were non-subscription but aimed at the UK only, or restricted from broadcasting outside the UK by way of programme rights (such as Channel 5) or governance (such as the BBC channels), were broadcast encrypted using Videoguard (as used by Sky (UK) for its pay-TV services) with viewing cards made available to UK residents only.

The launch of Astra 2D with a broadcast beam narrowly aimed only at the UK and Ireland enabled UK channels to switch from broadcasting free-to-view to free-to-air, while maintaining their UK exclusivity. The decline of UK free-to-view in favour of narrow-beamed free-to-air has been gradual:

The BBC's eight digital channels were encrypted under the scheme from their launch on digital satellite until 14 July 2003, when they became free-to-air.
Shortly after this, ITV stated its intentions to go free-to-air eventually, and launched their newest channel, ITV3, in the clear on 1 November 2004.
This was followed up by ITV moving its Men & Motors channel to FTA in July 2005.
This gradual conversion was completed on 1 November 2005, with ITV1 and ITV2 going FTA. ITV's latest channel, ITV4, was launched at the same time, also as a free-to-air service. All the BBC and ITV channels at this time could be viewed FTA without any subscription or purchase from Sky.
However, in June 2008, some ITV regional channels were encrypted again due to one of their narrow beam transponder agreements ending.
In April, 2011, high definition Channel 4 HD moved from being a free-to-view channel to a free-to-air channel (when moving to a transponder on Eurobird).
1 December 2011, 5USA, 5USA+1, 5* and 5*+1 became free-to-air after moving to Astra 1N.
6 June 2012, Pick TV and Pick TV +1 became free-to-air.
During October 2012, the final free-to-view regions of ITV1, ITV1 +1 and ITV1 HD became free-to-air.
25 March 2013, Viva went free-to-air.
28 October 2013, Channel 5 HD switched from free-to-view became a subscription channel on the Sky digital satellite platform and is no longer a channel.
LFC TV switched from free-to-view to Sky subscription only.
7 February 2017, 4Music became free-to-air, although it reverted to being free-to-view on 12 December 2018, but later became free-to-air again on 1 February 2022.

The remaining channel aimed exclusively at the UK that use the Astra satellites at 28.2°E with a Europe-wide beam and remain free-to-view and encrypted is Sony Entertainment Television and they can be viewed with a Sky Videoguard receiver and a Sky viewing card, either an inactive former Sky pay-TV card or one for the Freesat from Sky package, bought for a one-off fee.

Free-to-view networks

ABS-CBN TV Plus

A proprietary digital terrestrial set-top box (also known as the Mahiwagang Black Box) which offers free-to-air legacy Philippine TV networks' channels and additional free-to-view channels from the ABS-CBN Corporation.  The free-to-view channels include Cinemo!, Yey, DZMM Teleradyo, and the Knowledge Channel.  The one-off cost for the box is ₱1,499 (approximately US$28) and viewers will need to insert the sim card provided with the box into their mobile phone to activate or decrypt the free-to-view channels. These channels are free-to-view in the sense that although they are not subject to a recurring subscription, they cannot be accessed on generic or non-proprietary ISDB-T receiving devices.

Freesat from Sky

A UK satellite service from Sky (UK) offering 240 free-to-air and free-to-view TV channels and the Sky EPG, with a one-off payment for a Sky receiver, dish, installation and viewing card.

HD+
A package of 21 high definition digital satellite TV channels for German-speaking viewers and a subsidiary company of satellite owner SES, with a monthly or annual fee for the viewing card.

Viewer Access Satellite Television
Australian satellite television platform providing digital TV and radio services to remote and rural areas, and terrestrial black spots. VAST is partly funded by the Australian Government and requires a certified set-top box and viewing card.

Fransat
A package of mostly HD channels broadcast to residents of France who cannot receive the digital terrestrial TV channels. Can be received all over Europe on Eutelsat 5WA, historical position for French free TV. Viewing card does not expire.

Tivùsat
Italian package of 68 free-to-air and free-to-view satellite channels for viewers unable to receive them on national terrestrial TV networks. Requires a Nagravision receiver and viewing card.

TNTSAT
Same as Fransat, TNTSAT broadcasts the all-HD channels from French free digital terrestrial television. TNTSAT is issued by Canal + group on its main position, Astra 1. Viewing card has to be renewed every 4 years. TNTSAT compatible equipment is also compatible with CANALSAT pay TV.

Tricolor TV
Russian satellite TV service partly operating within the free-to-view model.

See also
Free TV Alliance – European organisation promoting free-to-air and free-to-view TV

References

External links
Free-to-view satellite television channels
Free-to-listen satellite radio stations

Television terminology